Ellen Skerritt (born 20 December 1994) is an Australian military officer and former professional racing cyclist. After ending her cycling career, Skerritt became a Lieutenant in the Australian Army in 2019.

Major results

2015
 1st  Young rider classification Women's Tour of New Zealand
 National Under-23 Road Championships
2nd Time trial
3rd Road race
 Oceania Road Cycling Championships
4th Under-23 time trial
5th Under-23 road race
9th Time trial
 8th Cadel Evans Great Ocean Road Race
2016
 National Under-23 Road Championships
2nd Time trial
3rd Road race

See also
 List of 2016 UCI Women's Teams and riders

References

External links
 

1994 births
Living people
Australian female cyclists
Place of birth missing (living people)
Royal Military College, Duntroon graduates